"No Promises" is a song by Australian band Icehouse, released in October 1985, as the first single issued from the band's 1986 album, Measure for Measure. The single was released in Australia through Regular Records, on 7", 12" and maxi-cassette single formats. Chrysalis Records issued the single in the UK and Europe on 7" and 12" formats, with different track listings. "No Promises" was subsequently released in the US by Chrysalis on 7" and 12" formats, again with different track listings. The single peaked at #30 on the Australian singles chart in February 1986. A remixed version by (Love) Tattoo was included on the Icehouse remix album Meltdown in 2002.
Two music videos were filmed to promote the single; the second of these was directed by Dieter Trattmann.

Track listings
7" single (Australian/NZ release)
"No Promises" - 4:10
"The Perfect Crime" - 3:34

7" single (UK/Europe release)
"No Promises" - 4:10
"The Perfect Crime" - 3:34

12" single (Australian/NZ release)
"No Promises" (extended mix)
"The Tempest"
"Gravity" 
"Terra Incognito"

12" single (UK/Europe release)
"No Promises" (extended mix) - 7:00
"No Promises" - 3:40
"The Perfect Crime" - 5:58

7" single (US release)
"No Promises" - 3:59
"Into The Wild" - 4:52

12" single (US release)
"No Promises" (club mix) - 8:45
"No Promises" (dub) - 5:10
"No Promises" (instrumental) - 4:40

Charts

References

1985 singles
1985 songs
Chrysalis Records singles
Icehouse (band) songs
Regular Records singles
Songs written by Iva Davies